John Jillard (28 March 1941 – 28 December 1998) was an Australian rules footballer who played for the Footscray Football Club in the Victorian Football League (VFL) and Latrobe Football Club in the North West Football Union (NWFU). He was a half back flanker and won the Charles Sutton Medal for Footscray's Best and Fairest in 1967. In the same year he finished 10th in the Brownlow Medal count, having placed 8th two years earlier.

In 2002 he was named in Footscray's official 'Team of the Century' and inducted into the club hall of fame in 2014.

He also played for Latrobe and Ainslie.

References

External links

1941 births
1998 deaths
Australian rules footballers from Victoria (Australia)
Western Bulldogs players
Charles Sutton Medal winners
Latrobe Football Club players
Ainslie Football Club players
Ainslie Football Club coaches